Aida is a live album of solo acoustic performances by guitarist Derek Bailey which was recorded in Paris and London in 1980 and released by Incus.

Reception 

The Allmusic review by Brian Olewnick states "Aida is a remarkably beautiful entry to one of the world's masterful musicians. Indeed, he sounds like no one else".

Track listing 
All compositions by Derek Bailey.

 "Paris" – 19:36
 "Niigata Snow" – 6:55
 "An Echo in Another's Mind" – 14:07

Personnel 
Derek Bailey – acoustic guitar

References 

Free improvisation albums
Incus Records live albums
Derek Bailey (guitarist) live albums
1980 live albums